Mount Defiance is a mountain in Ringwood State Park in Passaic County, New Jersey. It is part of the Ramapo Mountains.

References

External links 
 Ringwood State Park

Landforms of Passaic County, New Jersey
Mountains of New Jersey
Ramapos
Ringwood, New Jersey